Sweezy is a surname. Notable people with the surname include:

Carl Sweezy (1881–1953), American painter
J. R. Sweezy (born 1989), American football player
Nancy Sweezy (1921–2010), American artist, author, folklorist, advocate, scholar, and preservationist
Paul Sweezy (1910–2004), Marxist economist, political activist, publisher, and editor